Alfre Woodard is an American actress and producer. She has been nominated once for an Academy Award and twice for a Grammy Award and 18 times for an Emmy Award (winning four) and has also won a Golden Globe Award and three Screen Actors Guild Awards. In 2020, The New York Times ranked Woodard seventeenth on its list of "The 25 Greatest Actors of the 21st Century". She is also known for her work as a political activist and producer. Woodard is a founder of Artists for a New South Africa, an organization devoted to advancing democracy and equality in that country. She is a board member of Academy of Motion Picture Arts and Sciences.

Major Associations

Academy Awards

BAFTA Awards

Golden Globe Award

Grammy Award

Emmy Awards

Screen Actors Guild Award

Independent Spirit Awards

Other Awards

Black Reel Awards

NAACP Image Award

Satellite Awards

Film critic awards

Miscellaneous awards

References

Woodard, Alfre